Rustic Period, lit. The Age of Wild Men, is a South Korean television series aired from July 29, 2002 to September 30, 2003 on SBS. It focused on the life of historical figure Kim Du-han, a former mob leader turned politician, and the tumultuous modern history of Korea from the Japanese occupation to Park Chung-hee regime.

The show aired on SBS on Mondays to Tuesdays at 22:00 for 124 episodes beginning July 29, 2002, and still remains as one of the highest-rated television shows in Korean broadcast history.

Cast

Main
 Ahn Jae-mo as Kim Du-han (Part 1)
 Kim Yeong-cheol as older Kim Doo-han (Part 2)
 Choi Cheol-ho as Uhm Dong-wook
 Lee Won-jong as Goo Ma-juk
 Lee Chang-hoon as Hyashi

Supporting

 Choi Dong-joon as Kim Jwa-jin
 Lee Duk-hee as Mrs. Oh
 Jung Young-sook as Doo-han's grandmother
 Jeon Mi-seon as Park Gye-sook
 Go Doo-shim as Doo-han's grandmother
 Jo Hyung-ki as Doo-han's uncle
 Lee Soon-jae as Won Yeong-gi
 Jung Dong-hwan as Choi Dong-yeol
 Choi Hang-suk as Im Dong-ho
 Lee Won-yong as Kim Yi-soo
 Lee Jae-po as Wang Bal
 Jung Eun-chan as Moong Chi
 Yoon Taek-sang as Sya Cheu
 Park Jun-gyu as Ssang Kkal
 Park Young-rok as Kim Young-tae
 Jang Se-jin as Moon Yeong-cheol
 Choi Sang-hak as Beon Kae
 Jang Dong-jik as Yoo Tae-gwon
 Son Jong-bum as Na Suk-joo
 Lee Jae-yong as Miwa Wasaburo 
 Kim Sung-soo as Omura
 Kim Ho-jin as Kim Tae-seo
 Yang Hyung-ho as Moon Dal-young
 Sung Dong-il as Kae Ko
 Lee Dong-hoon as young Kae Ko
 Ryu Jong-won as child Kae Ko
 Lee Sang-in as Gamisora
 Lee Se-chang as Shibaru
 Park Seung-ho as Miura
 Nam Il-woo as Gonoe
 Heo Young-ran as Sul Hyang
 Jo Yeo-jung as Ae Ran
 Jung So-young as Park In-ae
 Nam Hyun-joo as Maria Park
 Lee In-cheol as Lee Ki-bung
 Kwon Sung-deok as Syngman Rhee
 Moon Hoe-won as Kim Yoo-shik
 Jo Sang-goo as Shirasoni
 Suh Hyun-suk as Jung Jin-young
 Kim Jung-min as young Jung Jin-young
 Lee Il-hwa as Lee Yeon Suk
 Im Byung-ki as Park Hun-young
 Nam Sung-jin as Kwak Young-joo
 Jun Moo-song as Saitō Makoto
 Bae Do-hwan as Han Baek-soo
 Shim Hyung-tak as Jung Woon-kyung
 Park Jung-hak as Tokuyama
 Kim Hyuk as Lee Jung-jae
 Kim Yeong-ho as old Lee Jung-jae
 Lee Hyo-jung as Yu Chin-san
 Kim Hak-cheol as Chough Pyung-ok
 Lim Hyeok-ju as Chang Taek-sang
 Ahn Shin-woo as Park In-suk
 Kim Young-in as Shim Young
 Jo Sang-gi as Sanghai Jo
 Kim Ji-young as Congresswoman Park Soon-cheon

Cameos

 Choi Jae-sung
 Choi Il-hwa
 Lee Seung-gi
 Kim Hee-jung
 Kim Jong-kook

References

Seoul Broadcasting System television dramas
2002 South Korean television series debuts
2003 South Korean television series endings
Korean-language television shows
South Korean historical television series
Television series set in the Joseon dynasty
Television series set in Korea under Japanese rule